My Favorites of Hank Williams is an album by American country music artist George Jones. It was released in 1962 on the United Artists record label. It was Jones' second tribute to the music of Hank Williams.

Background
Jones's first release on Mercury Records in 1960 had been George Jones Salutes Hank Williams, which features twelve sides made famous by the late country star.  My Favorites of Hank Williams includes twelve more recordings in much the same vein, with strict country arrangements, but Jones's voice has matured and is noticeably lower than it was earlier in his career when his vocal style was more derivative of his doomed idol.  Jones always cited Hank Williams as one of his biggest musical influences.  In 1949, Jones actually met Williams when Hank appeared on KRIC in Beaumont, a radio station where a teenage Jones had secured a gig backing an old time country duet act Eddie and Pearl.  In a 2006 television interview with Bill Cody Jones recalled, "He had to be the nicest guy I'd ever met in my life, so down to earth...He had a big hit out at the time called 'Wedding Bells'.  I was gonna play guitar with him on this radio show...I'm standing on the other side of the mic – that's when the mic came out of the ceiling – I'm standing there ready to kick it off and instead he starts singin'.  So that beat me out of the kick off, you know,  I'd rehearsed and rehearsed...He finished the song and I hadn't hit a note.  Not a note.  I just stared at him.  I was amazed."
   
In the 1989 video documentary Same Ole Me, Jones admitted, "I couldn't think or eat nothin' unless it was Hank Williams, and I couldn't wait for his next record to come out. He had to be, really, the greatest."  In his memoir, Jones recalled learning about Williams death on New Year's Day 1953 while he was serving a stint in the marines stationed in San Jose, California.  After a friend showed him the headline in the paper, Jones wrote that he "lay there and bawled", adding that "Hank Williams had been my biggest musical influence.  By that thinking you could say he was the biggest part of my life.  That's how personally I took him and his songs."

Reception
AllMusic's Stephen Thomas Erlewine observes that My Favorites "does differ from the previous Mercury recordings in terms of production – the UA release is slightly smoother, yet it is still firmly in the honky tonk tradition" and comments that Jones delivers the songs "with affection and grit, making the record a thoroughly enjoyable listen."

Track listing
All songs by Hank Williams, except where noted.

"You're Gonna Change (Or I'm Gonna Leave)" – 2:14
"You Win Again" – 2:27
"Mansion on the Hill" (Fred Rose, Williams) – 2:21
"I Just Don't Like This Kind of Living" – 2:29
"Lonesome Whistle" (Jimmie Davis, Williams) – 2:20
"Wedding Bells" (Claude Boone) – 2:10
"Your Cheatin' Heart" – 2:28
"They'll Never Take Her Love from Me" (Leon Payne) – 2:29
"I Heard You Crying in Your Sleep" – 2:10
"A House Without Love" – 2:24
"I Could Never Be Ashamed of You" – 2:22
"Take These Chains from My Heart" (Hy Heath, Rose) – 2:20

External links
George Jones' Official Website

1962 albums
George Jones albums
Albums produced by Pappy Daily
United Artists Records albums
Hank Williams tribute albums